The , usually known as the  or simply EE, is a European organisation of breeders of poultry, pigeons, rabbits, guinea-pigs and cage-birds. It is now based in Luxembourg. It represents some 2.5 million members from 31 countries. It sometimes uses an alternative name:
 
 
  European Association of Poultry, Pigeon, Cage Bird, Rabbit and Cavy Breeders.

References 

Organisations based in Luxembourg
Animal breeding organizations
Aviculture
Leporidae